, the World Checklist of Selected Plant Families accepted the following species of Eragrostis.

A

 Eragrostis acamptoclada Cope – S. Tropical Africa
 Eragrostis acraea De Winter – S. Tropical & S. Africa
 Eragrostis acutiflora (Kunth) Nees – Tropical America
 Eragrostis acutiglumis Parodi – S. Brazil to N.E. Argentina
 Eragrostis aegyptiaca (Willd.) Delile – N. & W. Tropical Africa to Sudan
 Eragrostis aethiopica Chiov. – Ethiopia to S. Africa, Madagascar, Arabian Peninsula
 Eragrostis airoides Nees – Colombia to Venezuela, Bolivia to Brazil and N. Argentina
 Eragrostis alopecuroides Balansa – Indo-China
 Eragrostis alta Keng – Hainan
 Eragrostis alveiformis Lazarides – E. Australia
 Eragrostis amabilis (L.) Wight & Arn. – Tropical & Subtrop. Old World
 Eragrostis amanda Clayton – Kenya
 Eragrostis ambleia Clayton – Somalia to Kenya
 Eragrostis ambohibengensis A.Camus – Madagascar
 Eragrostis ambositrensis A.Camus – Madagascar
 Eragrostis ambrensis A.Camus – Madagascar
 Eragrostis amurensis Prob. – S.E. Belarus to Russian Far East and Mongolia
 Eragrostis anacrantha Cope – Zambia
 Eragrostis anacranthoides Cope – Zambia
 Eragrostis andicola R.E.Fr. – Peru, N.W. Argentina
 Eragrostis annulata Rendle ex Scott Elliot – Angola to S. Africa
 Eragrostis apiculata Döll – Brazil (Minas Gerais)
 Eragrostis aquatica Honda – Japan (W. Honshu)
 Eragrostis arenicola C.E.Hubb. – Tropical & S. Africa
 Eragrostis aristata De Winter – Namibia
 Eragrostis aristiglumis Kabuye – S.W. Tanzania
 Eragrostis articulata (Schrank) Nees – Bolivia to Brazil and N. Argentina
 Eragrostis aspera (Jacq.) Nees – Africa, Arabian Peninsula, S. India, Indo-China
 Eragrostis astrepta S.M.Phillips – Ethiopia
 Eragrostis astreptoclada Cope – Tanzania to Zambia
 Eragrostis atropioides Hildebr. – Hawaiian Islands
 Eragrostis atrovirens (Desf.) Trin. ex Steud. – Tropical & Subtrop. Old World
 Eragrostis attenuata Hitchc. – S.W. Peru to N. Chile
 Eragrostis aurorae Launert – S. Tropical Africa
 Eragrostis australasica (Steud.) C.E.Hubb. – Australia
 Eragrostis autumnalis Keng – Central & S. China

B

 Eragrostis bahamensis Hitchc. – Bahamas to Turks-Caicos Islands
 Eragrostis bahiensis Schult. – Mexico to S. Tropical America
 Eragrostis balgooyi Veldkamp – New Guinea (Kep. Aru)
 Eragrostis barbinodis Hack. – Mozambique to S. Africa
 Eragrostis barbulata Stapf – Myanmar
 Eragrostis barrelieri Daveau – Macaronesia to Arabian Peninsula, Mediterranean to Pakistan
 Eragrostis barteri C.E.Hubb. – W. Tropical Africa to Chad
 Eragrostis basedowii Jedwabn. – Australia
 Eragrostis bemarivensis A.Camus – Madagascar
 Eragrostis bergiana (Kunth) Trin. – S. Africa
 Eragrostis berteroniana (Schult.) Steud. – Cuba to Hispaniola
 Eragrostis betsileensis A.Camus – Madagascar
 Eragrostis bicolor Nees – S. Tropical & S. Africa
 Eragrostis biflora Hack. – Ethiopia, S. Tropical & S. Africa
 Eragrostis blepharostachya K.Schum. – W. Tropical Africa
 Eragrostis boinensis A.Camus – Madagascar
 Eragrostis boivinii Steud. – Madagascar
 Eragrostis boriana Launert – Iraq
 Eragrostis botryodes Clayton – Ethiopia to S. Tropical Africa
 Eragrostis brainii (Stent) Launert – S. Tropical Africa
 Eragrostis braunii Schweinf. – N.E. & E. Tropical Africa to Arabian Peninsula
 Eragrostis brizantha Nees – S. Africa
 Eragrostis brownii (Kunth) Nees – Tropical & Subtrop. Asia to Easter I
 Eragrostis burmanica Bor – S. India, W. Indo-China

C

 Eragrostis caesia Stapf – Zimbabwe to S .Africa
 Eragrostis caespitosa Chiov. – Somalia to Mozambique
 Eragrostis camerunensis Clayton – Nigeria to Cameroon
 Eragrostis canescens C.E.Hubb. – Tanzania to Malawi
 Eragrostis caniflora Rendle – Tanzania to S. Tropical Africa
 Eragrostis capensis (Thunb.) Trin. – Congo to Ethiopia and S. Africa, Madagascar
 Eragrostis capillaris (L.) Nees – E. Canada to Central Mexico
 Eragrostis capitula Lazarides – Queensland
 Eragrostis capitulifera Chiov. – Ethiopia to N. Kenya
 Eragrostis capuronii A.Camus – Madagascar
 Eragrostis cassa Lazarides – Queensland
 Eragrostis castellaneana Buscal. & Muschl. – Tanzania to S. Tropical Africa
 Eragrostis cataclasta Nicora – Brazil to N.E. Argentina
 Eragrostis cenolepis Clayton – W. Tropical Africa to Cameroon
 Eragrostis chabouisii Bosser – Madagascar
 Eragrostis chalarothyrsos C.E.Hubb. – W. Tropical Africa to Ethiopia and Tanzania
 Eragrostis chapelieri (Kunth) Nees – Tropical & S. Africa, Madagascar
 Eragrostis chiquitaniensis Killeen – Bolivia to Paraguay
 Eragrostis cilianensis (All.) Janch. – Old World
 Eragrostis ciliaris (L.) R.Br. – Tropical & Subtrop. Old World
 Eragrostis ciliata (Roxb.) Nees – India, Sri Lanka, Indo-China, Hainan, Jawa
 Eragrostis cimicina Launert – S. Tropical & S. Africa
 Eragrostis coarctata Stapf – Indian Subcontinent to Indo-China
 Eragrostis collina Trin. – E. Europe to N.W. China and Iran
 Eragrostis collinensis Vivek, G.V.S.Murthy & V.J.Nair – S.W. India
 Eragrostis comptonii De Winter – Swaziland
 Eragrostis concinna (R.Br.) Steud. – N. Australia
 Eragrostis condensata (J.Presl) Steud. – Ecuador
 Eragrostis conertii Lobin – Cape Verde
 Eragrostis confertiflora J.M.Black – Australia
 Eragrostis congesta Oliv. – Congo to Kenya and KwaZulu-Natal
 Eragrostis contrerasii R.W.Pohl – S. Mexico to Guatemala
 Eragrostis crassinervis Hack. – Zimbabwe to S. Africa
 Eragrostis crateriformis Lazarides – N.W. & Central Australia
 Eragrostis cubensis Hitchc. – Cuba, Jamaica
 Eragrostis cumingii Steud. – Tropical & Subtrop. Asia to N. Australia
 Eragrostis curtipedicellata Buckley – Central & S.E. U.S.A. to N.E. Mexico
 Eragrostis curvula (Schrad.) Nees – Cameroon to Eritrea and S. Africa
 Eragrostis cylindrica (Roxb.) Arn. – Nepal, S.E. China to Vietnam, Taiwan
 Eragrostis cylindriflora Hochst. – Africa

D

 Eragrostis deccanensis Bor – S. India
 Eragrostis decumbens Renvoize – Aldabra
 Eragrostis deflexa Hitchc. – Hawaiian Islands
 Eragrostis dentifera Launert – Zambia
 Eragrostis desertorum Domin – Australia
 Eragrostis desolata Launert – E. Zimbabwe to Northern Province
 Eragrostis dielsii Pilg. – Australia
 Eragrostis dinteri Stapf – Angola to Botswana
 Eragrostis divaricata Cope – S. DR Congo to Zambia
 Eragrostis duricaulis B.S.Sun & S.Wang – China (Yunnan)
 Eragrostis dyskritos Lasut – Sulawesi

E

 Eragrostis ecarinata Lazarides – Northern Territory
 Eragrostis echinochloidea Stapf – Zimbabwe to S. Africa
 Eragrostis egregia Clayton – W. Tropical Africa
 Eragrostis elatior Stapf – Cape Province
 Eragrostis elegantissima Chiov. – W. Tropical Africa to Eritrea
 Eragrostis elliottii (Elliott) S.Watson – Central & S. U.S.A. to Honduras, Caribbean
 Eragrostis elongata (Willd.) J.Jacq. – Tropical & Subtrop. Asia to Australia
 Eragrostis episcopulus Lambdon, Darlow, Clubbe & Cope – St. Helena
 Eragrostis eriopoda Benth. – Australia
 Eragrostis erosa Scribn. ex Beal – S. Central U.S.A. to N. Mexico
 Eragrostis exasperata Peter – Kenya to S. Tropical Africa
 Eragrostis exelliana Launert – Tanzania to Zambia
 Eragrostis exigua Lazarides – Australia

F

 Eragrostis falcata (Gaudich.) Steud. – Australia
 Eragrostis fallax Lazarides – N. Australia
 Eragrostis fastigiata Cope – Malawi (Mt. Mulanje)
 Eragrostis fauriei Ohwi – Taiwan
 Eragrostis fenshamii B.K.Simon – S. Queensland
 Eragrostis ferruginea (Thunb.) P.Beauv. – Himalaya to Temp. E. Asia
 Eragrostis filicaulis Lazarides – Australia
 Eragrostis fimbrillata Cope – Zambia
 Eragrostis flavicans Rendle – Tanzania to S. Tropical Africa
 Eragrostis fosbergii Whitney – Hawaiian Islands
 Eragrostis frankii Steud. – E. U.S.A. to Texas
 Eragrostis friesii Pilg. – S. Tropical Africa to Caprivi Strip

G

 Eragrostis gangetica (Roxb.) Steud. – Africa, Indian Subcontinent to Borneo
 Eragrostis georgii A.Chev. – Gabon
 Eragrostis glandulosipedata De Winter – S. Tropical & S. Africa
 Eragrostis glischra Launert – Zimbabwe
 Eragrostis gloeodes Ekman – Brazil (Mato Grosso do Sul)
 Eragrostis gloeophylla S.M.Phillips – E. Ethiopia to Somalia
 Eragrostis glutinosa (Sw.) Trin. – Cuba, Jamaica
 Eragrostis grandis Hildebr. – Hawaiian Islands
 Eragrostis guatemalensis Withersp. – Mexico to Guatemala
 Eragrostis guianensis Hitchc. – Venezuela to Guyana and N. Brazil
 Eragrostis gummiflua Nees – S. Tropical & S. Africa, Madagascar

H

 Eragrostis habrantha Rendle – S. Tropical & S. Africa
 Eragrostis hainanensis L.C.Chia – Hainan
 Eragrostis henryi Vivek, G.V.S.Murthy & V.J.Nair – India (Tamil Nadu)
 Eragrostis heteromera Stapf – Eritrea to S. Africa
 Eragrostis hierniana Rendle – Tanzania to S. Africa
 Eragrostis hildebrandtii Jedwabn. – Madagascar
 Eragrostis hirsuta (Michx.) Nees – Central & S.E. U.S.A. to Mexico
 Eragrostis hirta E.Fourn. – Mexico to Honduras
 Eragrostis hirticaulis Lazarides – N. Northern Territory
 Eragrostis hispida K.Schum. – South Sudan to S. Tropical Africa
 Eragrostis homblei De Wild. – Tanzania to Zambia
 Eragrostis homomalla Nees – Kenya to S. Africa
 Eragrostis hondurensis R.W.Pohl – S. Mexico to Central America
 Eragrostis hugoniana Rendle – China (Shaanxi)
 Eragrostis humbertii A.Camus – Madagascar
 Eragrostis humidicola Napper – DR Congo to E. Tropical Africa
 Eragrostis humifusa C.Cordem. – Réunion
 Eragrostis hypnoides (Lam.) Britton, Sterns & Poggenb. – America

I–K

 Eragrostis inamoena K.Schum. – Kenya to S. Africa
 Eragrostis incrassata Cope – Somalia
 Eragrostis infecunda J.M.Black – S.E. Australia
 Eragrostis intermedia Hitchc. – Central & E. U.S.A. to Colombia
 Eragrostis interrupta P.Beauv. – E. Australia
 Eragrostis invalida Pilg. – W. & W. Central Tropical Africa
 Eragrostis jacobsiana B.K.Simon – N. Queensland
 Eragrostis jainii Vivek, G.V.S.Murthy & V.J.Nair – S.W. India
 Eragrostis japonica (Thunb.) Trin. – Tropical & Subtrop. Old World
 Eragrostis jerichoensis B.K.Simon – Central Queensland
 Eragrostis kennedyae F.Turner – Australia
 Eragrostis kingesii De Winter – Namibia to Cape Province
 Eragrostis kohorica Quézel – Chad (Tibesti)
 Eragrostis kuchariana S.M.Phillips – Somalia
 Eragrostis kuschelii Skottsb. – Desventurados Islands

L

 Eragrostis lacunaria F.Muell. – Australia
 Eragrostis laevissima Hack. – Namibia to Botswana
 Eragrostis lanicaulis Lazarides – Australia
 Eragrostis laniflora Benth. – Australia
 Eragrostis lanipes C.E.Hubb. – Western Australia to South Australia
 Eragrostis lappula Nees – Kenya to S. Africa
 Eragrostis lateritica Bosser – Madagascar
 Eragrostis latifolia Cope – Zimbabwe
 Eragrostis leersiiformis Launert – Tanzania to Namibia
 Eragrostis lehmanniana Nees – S. Tropical & S. Africa
 Eragrostis lepida (A.Rich.) Hochst. ex Steud. – N.E. Tropical Africa to Kenya, Arabian Peninsula
 Eragrostis lepidobasis Cope – Zambia
 Eragrostis leptocarpa Benth. – Australia
 Eragrostis leptophylla Hitchc. – Hawaiian Islands
 Eragrostis leptostachya (R.Br.) Steud. – E. & S.E. Australia
 Eragrostis leptotricha Cope – Zimbabwe to Botswana
 Eragrostis leucosticta Nees ex Döll – Brazil to Paraguay
 Eragrostis lichiangensis Jedwabn. – China (N.W. Yunnan)
 Eragrostis lingulata Clayton – W. Tropical Africa
 Eragrostis longifolia (A.Rich.) Hochst. ex Steud. – Ethiopia, Yemen
 Eragrostis longipedicellata B.K.Simon – S.E. Queensland
 Eragrostis longiramea Swallen – Mexico
 Eragrostis lugens Nees – Central & S.E. U.S.A. to El Salvador, S. Tropical America to Argentina
 Eragrostis lurida J.Presl – W. South America
 Eragrostis lutensis Cope – Somalia
 Eragrostis lutescens Scribn. – W. & W. Central U.S.A

M

 Eragrostis macilenta (A.Rich.) Steud. – Tropical Africa, Madagascar, S.W. Arabian Peninsula, India
 Eragrostis macrochlamys Pilg. – S. Africa
 Eragrostis macrothyrsa Hack. – Bolivia to Brazil (Mato Grosso di Sul, Santa Catarina)
 Eragrostis maderaspatana Bor – India, Sri Lanka
 Eragrostis magna Hitchc. – Peru
 Eragrostis mahrana Schweinf. – N.E. Tropical Africa to Arabian Peninsula
 Eragrostis majungensis A.Camus – Madagascar
 Eragrostis mandrarensis A.Camus – Madagascar
 Eragrostis mariae Launert – Zambia
 Eragrostis mauiensis Hitchc. – Hawaiian Islands
 Eragrostis maypurensis (Kunth) Steud. – Mexico to S. Tropical America
 Eragrostis membranacea Hack. – S. Tropical & S. Africa
 Eragrostis mexicana (Hornem.) Link – N. America to Argentina
 Eragrostis micrantha Hack. – Angola to S. Africa
 Eragrostis microcarpa Vickery – Central & E. Australia
 Eragrostis microsperma Rendle – Angola
 Eragrostis mildbraedii Pilg. – Kenya to Botswana
 Eragrostis milnei Launert ex Cope – Zambia
 Eragrostis minor Host – Old World
 Eragrostis moggii De Winter – Mozambique to S. Africa
 Eragrostis mokensis Pilg. – Nigeria to W. Central Tropical Africa
 Eragrostis mollior Pilg. – Uganda to S. Tropical Africa
 Eragrostis montana Balansa – Indo-China to W. Malesia
 Eragrostis monticola (Gaudich.) Hildebr. – Hawaiian Islands
 Eragrostis muerensis Pilg. – Tanzania to Zambia
 Eragrostis multicaulis Steud. – Tropical & Subtrop. Asia to Russian Far East
 Eragrostis multiflora Trin. – Tropical Africa to Myanmar

N
 Eragrostis nairii Kalidass – N.E. India
 Eragrostis neesii Trin. – Brazil to N. Argentina
 Eragrostis nigra Nees ex Steud. – Caucasus to China and Indo-China
 Eragrostis nigricans (Kunth) Steud. – W. South America to N.W. Argentina
 Eragrostis nilgiriensis Vivek, G.V.S.Murthy & V.J.Nair – India (Tamil Nadu)
 Eragrostis nindensis Ficalho & Hiern – Tanzania to S. Africa
 Eragrostis nutans (Retz.) Nees ex Steud. – Indian Subcontinent to Malesia

O
 Eragrostis obtusa Munro ex Ficalho & Hiern – S. Africa
 Eragrostis olida Lazarides – N. Australia
 Eragrostis oligostachya Cope – Zambia
 Eragrostis olivacea K.Schum. – Ethiopia to S. Tropical Africa
 Eragrostis omahekensis De Winter – Namibia
 Eragrostis oreophila L.H.Harv. – Mexico
 Eragrostis orthoclada Hack. – Bolivia to N. Argentina

P

 Eragrostis pallens Hack. – S. Tropical & S. Africa
 Eragrostis palmeri S.Watson – S. Central U.S.A. to Mexico
 Eragrostis palustris Zon – Cameroon
 Eragrostis paniciformis (A.Braun) Steud. – Eritrea to Zambia
 Eragrostis papposa (Roem. & Schult.) Steud. – S.E. Spain to N.W. Africa, N.E. & E. Tropical Africa to Myanmar
 Eragrostis paradoxa Launert – S. Tropical Africa
 Eragrostis parviflora (R.Br.) Trin. – Australia, New Guinea to New Caledonia
 Eragrostis pascua S.M.Phillips – Eritrea to Ethiopia
 Eragrostis pastoensis (Kunth) Trin. – S. Tropical America
 Eragrostis patens Oliv. – Congo, Kenya to S. Africa
 Eragrostis patentipilosa Hack. – Ethiopia to S. Africa
 Eragrostis patentissima Hack. – S. Africa
 Eragrostis patula (Kunth) Steud. – Ecuador
 Eragrostis paupera Jedwabn. – Hawaiian Islands
 Eragrostis pectinacea (Michx.) Nees – America
 Eragrostis perbella K.Schum. – Somalia to Tanzania
 Eragrostis perennans Keng – S. China to Hainan
 Eragrostis perennis Döll – Bolivia to Brazil and N.E. Argentina
 Eragrostis pergracilis S.T.Blake – Australia
 Eragrostis perplexa L.H.Harv. – W. Central & Central U.S.A. to N.E. Mexico
 Eragrostis perrieri A.Camus – Madagascar
 Eragrostis peruviana (Jacq.) Trin. – Peru to N. Chile, Desventurados Islands
 Eragrostis petraea Lazarides – N. Western Australia, N. Northern Territory
 Eragrostis petrensis Renvoize & Longhi-Wagner – Brazil (Bahia, Minas Gerais, Rio de Janeiro)
 Eragrostis phyllacantha Cope – Zimbabwe to Botswana
 Eragrostis pilgeri Fedde – Peru (Ancash, Cajamarca)
 Eragrostis pilgeriana Dinter ex Pilg. – Angola to S. Africa
 Eragrostis pilosa (L.) P.Beauv. – Old World
 Eragrostis pilosissima Link – S.E. China to Vietnam, Taiwan
 Eragrostis pilosiuscula Ohwi – S.E. China, Taiwan
 Eragrostis plana Nees – S. Tropical & S. Africa, Madagascar
 Eragrostis planiculmis Nees – S. Tropical & S. Africa
 Eragrostis plumbea Scribn. ex Beal – Mexico
 Eragrostis plurigluma C.E.Hubb. – W. Tropical Africa to Zambia
 Eragrostis plurinodis Swallen – Venezuela to Guyana and N. Brazil
 Eragrostis pobeguinii C.E.Hubb. – W. Tropical Africa to Cameroon
 Eragrostis poculiformis Cope – Tanzania
 Eragrostis polytricha Nees – Florida, Texas to S. Tropical America
 Eragrostis porosa Nees – Ethiopia to S. Africa, Arabian Peninsula
 Eragrostis potamophila Lazarides – N. Western Australia to N. Northern Territory
 Eragrostis pringlei Mattei – Mexico
 Eragrostis procumbens Nees – Zimbabwe to S. Africa
 Eragrostis prolifera (Sw.) Steud. – Tropical & Subtrop. America, W. Trop. Africa to Angola
 Eragrostis propinqua Steud. – Mauritius
 Eragrostis psammophila S.M.Phillips – Somalia
 Eragrostis pseudopoa C.E.Hubb. – S.W. Tanzania, Northern Province
 Eragrostis pubescens (R.Br.) Steud. – Thailand to N. & E. Australia
 Eragrostis punctiglandulosa Cope – Zambia (Kafue Flats)
 Eragrostis purpurascens (Spreng.) Schult. – Lesser Antilles, S. Brazil to Uruguay
 Eragrostis pusilla Hack. – S. Tropical & S. Africa
 Eragrostis pycnantha (Phil.) Parodi ex Nicora – Chile
 Eragrostis pycnostachys Clayton – Kenya
 Eragrostis pygmaea De Winter – Namibia

R

 Eragrostis racemosa (Thunb.) Steud. – Eritrea to S. Africa, Seychelles, Madagascar
 Eragrostis raynaliana Lebrun – Cameroon
 Eragrostis refracta (Muhl.) Scribn. – E. Central & S.E. U.S.A., Suriname
 Eragrostis rejuvenescens Rendle – S. DR Congo to Angola
 Eragrostis remotiflora De Winter – S. Africa
 Eragrostis reptans (Michx.) Nees – Central & S.E. U.S.A. to E. Mexico
 Eragrostis retinens Hack. & Arechav. – S. Brazil to N.E. Argentina
 Eragrostis rigidiuscula Domin – N. Australia
 Eragrostis riobrancensis Judz. & P.M.Peterson – Guyana to N. Brazil
 Eragrostis riparia (Willd.) Nees – Tropical Asia
 Eragrostis rivalis H.Scholz – E. Europe
 Eragrostis rogersii C.E.Hubb. – S. Tropical Africa to Botswana
 Eragrostis rojasii Hack. – Brazil to N.E. Argentina
 Eragrostis rotifer Rendle – Tanzania to S. Africa
 Eragrostis rottleri Stapf – India (S.E. & S. Tamil Nadu)
 Eragrostis rufescens Schult. – Mexico to Paraguay
 Eragrostis rufinerva L.C.Chia – Hainan

S
 Eragrostis sabinae Launert – Namibia
 Eragrostis sabulicola Pilger ex Jedwabn. – W. Central Tropical Africa
 Eragrostis sabulosa (Steud.) Schweick. – Cape Province
 Eragrostis sambiranensis A.Camus – Madagascar
 Eragrostis santapaui K.G.Bhat & Nagendran – India (Karnataka)
 Eragrostis saresberiensis Launert – Tanzania to Zimbabwe
 Eragrostis sarmentosa (Thunb.) Trin. – Chad (Tibesti), S. Tropical & S. Africa, Madagascar
 Eragrostis saxatilis Hemsl. – S.W. & Central St. Helena
 Eragrostis scabriflora Swallen – Pacific
 Eragrostis scaligera Steud. – French Guiana to Brazil
 Eragrostis schultzii Benth. – N. Australia
 Eragrostis schweinfurthii Chiov. – Eritrea to Malawi, S.W. Arabian Peninsula, Sri Lanka
 Eragrostis sclerantha Nees – Tanzania to S. Africa
 Eragrostis sclerophylla Trin. – Brazil (Minas Gerais)
 Eragrostis scopelophila Pilg. – Namibia
 Eragrostis scotelliana Rendle – W. & W. Central Tropical Africa
 Eragrostis secundiflora J.Presl – Central & S. U.S.A. to S. Tropical America
 Eragrostis seminuda Trin. – Brazil to N.E. Argentina
 Eragrostis sennii Chiov. – Somalia to Kenya
 Eragrostis sericata Cope – Mozambique
 Eragrostis sessilispica Buckley – Central U.S.A. to N.E. Mexico
 Eragrostis setifolia Nees – Australia
 Eragrostis setulifera Pilg. – Tanzania to Zambia
 Eragrostis silveana Swallen – S. Texas to Mexico
 Eragrostis simpliciflora (J.Presl) Steud. – S.E. Mexico to Central America
 Eragrostis singuaensis Pilg. – Cameroon
 Eragrostis solida Nees – Bolivia to Brazil and N.E. Argentina
 Eragrostis soratensis Jedwabn. – W. South America
 Eragrostis sororia Domin – E. Australia
 Eragrostis spartinoides Steud. – N. & E. Australia to Pacific
 Eragrostis speciosa (Roem. & Schult.) Steud. – Australia
 Eragrostis spectabilis (Pursh) Steud. – S. Canada to N.E. Mexico

 Eragrostis spicata Vasey – Texas to N. Mexico, Paraguay to N. Argentina
 Eragrostis spicigera Cope – Zambia
 Eragrostis squamata (Lam.) Steud. – Cape Verde, W. Tropical Africa to Chad
 Eragrostis stagnalis Lazarides – N. Northern Territory to Queensland
 Eragrostis stapfii De Winter – S. Tropical & S. Africa
 Eragrostis stenostachya (R.Br.) Steud. – N. Northern Territory to N. & N.E. Queensland
 Eragrostis stenothyrsa Pilg. – Namibia
 Eragrostis sterilis Domin – N. & E. Australia
 Eragrostis stolonifera A.Camus – Madagascar
 Eragrostis subaequiglumis Renvoize – Madagascar, Aldabra
 Eragrostis subglandulosa Cope – Botswana to Namibia
 Eragrostis subsecunda (Lam.) E.Fourn. – India to S. China and N.W. Pacific
 Eragrostis subtilis Lazarides – Central Australia
 Eragrostis superba Peyr. – Congo to Ethiopia and S. Africa
 Eragrostis surreyana K.A.Sheph. & Trudgen – N.W. Western Australia
 Eragrostis swallenii Hitchc. – S. Texas to Mexico
 Eragrostis sylviae Cope – Malawi (Mt. Mulanje)

T

 Eragrostis tef (Zuccagni) Trotter – N.E. & E. Tropical Africa, Arabian Peninsula
 Eragrostis tenellula (Kunth) Steud. – Australia
 Eragrostis tenuifolia (A.Rich.) Hochst. ex Steud. – Tropical & Subtrop. Old World
 Eragrostis tephrosanthos Schult. – America
 Eragrostis terecaulis Renvoize – Bolivia
 Eragrostis theinlwinii Bor – Myanmar
 Eragrostis thollonii Franch. – W. Central & S. Tropical Africa
 Eragrostis trachyantha Cope – Somalia
 Eragrostis trachycarpa (Benth.) Domin – S.E. Queensland to Central & E. Vicotria
 Eragrostis tracyi Hitchc. – Florida
 Eragrostis tremula Hochst. ex Steud. – Tropical Africa, Afghanistan to Indo-China
 Eragrostis triangularis Henrard – Paraguay
 Eragrostis trichocolea Arechav. – Brazil to N. Argentina
 Eragrostis trichodes (Nutt.) Alph.Wood – Central & E. U.S.A
 Eragrostis tridentata Cope – Somalia
 Eragrostis trimucronata Napper – Tanzania
 Eragrostis triquetra Lazarides – Queensland
 Eragrostis truncata Hack. – S. Africa
 Eragrostis turgida (Schumach.) De Wild. – W. Tropical Africa to W. Ethiopia

U
 Eragrostis udawnensis Ohwi – Thailand
 Eragrostis unioloides (Retz.) Nees ex Steud. – Tropical & Subtrop. Asia to N. & E. Queensland
 Eragrostis urbaniana Hitchc. – Caribbean
 Eragrostis usambarensis Napper – Tanzania
 Eragrostis uvida Lazarides – N. Australia
 Eragrostis uzondoiensis Sánchez-Ken – Tanzania

V

 Eragrostis vacillans Rendle – Angola
 Eragrostis vallsiana Boechat & Longhi-Wagner – Brazil
 Eragrostis variabilis (Gaudich.) Steud. – Hawaiian Islands
 Eragrostis variegata Welw. ex Rendle – Angola
 Eragrostis vatovae (Chiov.) S.M.Phillips – Somalia
 Eragrostis venustula Cope – S. Tropical Africa to Namibia
 Eragrostis vernix Boechat & Longhi-Wagner – N.E. Brazil
 Eragrostis viguieri A.Camus – Madagascar
 Eragrostis virescens J.Presl – W. Canada to Central Mexico, Venezuela to S. South America
 Eragrostis viscosa (Retz.) Trin. – Tropical & S. Africa, S. Arabian Peninsula, Trop. Asia
 Eragrostis volkensii Pilg. – Tropical & S. Africa
 Eragrostis vulcanica Jedwabn. – Bismarck Arch

W–Z

 Eragrostis walteri Pilg. – Namibia
 Eragrostis warburgii Hack. – S. & E. Malesia to New Guinea
 Eragrostis weberbaueri Pilg. – Peru to N. Chile
 Eragrostis welwitschii Rendle – Tropical Africa
 Eragrostis xerophila Domin – Australia
 Eragrostis zeylanica Nees & Meyen – Indian Subcontinent to Indo-China

References

  
Eragrostis